Matt Pilkington is an English football manager, who is currently head coach for New York City FC II in MLS Next Pro.

Playing career 
Born in England, Pilkington was part of the academy of Rochdale F.C. as a child.

Pilkington studied in the US, featuring for the collegiate teams for George Washington University. After graduation he signed for the Richmond Kickers, then competing in the second tier of the A-League but shortly to transfer to the United Soccer League.

Managerial career 
Before beginning his playing career Matt Pilkington began his transition to coaching, receiving an English FA coaching licence in 1998.

In 2005, Matt Pilkington joined the DC United academy set-up, remaining as part of the coaching staff until 2008. Several years later he would return to coaching, joining Bethesda-Olney in the U.S. Soccer Development Academy. In 2014 he transferred to local New York youth team Downtown United SC, for whom he would act as academy technical director across age groups from under-12 to under-18. Through Downtown United's connection to new MLS side New York City FC he would earn a move to NYCFC's nascent academy structure, starting as u-15/u-16 head coach and working his way up to u-19 head coach.

On 9 February 2022 he was appointed as the first ever head coach of New York City FC II, NYCFC's development team playing in the newly formed MLS Next Pro.

Managerial statistics 
All competitive games (league, domestic and continental cups) are included.

Honours 
 New York City FC u-16
 Generation Adidas Cup Premier Division Champions: 2017
 New York City FC u-19
 USSDA Championship: 2018, 2019

References 

Living people
English football managers
Sportspeople from Rochdale
New York City FC non-playing staff
New York City FC II head coaches
Year of birth missing (living people)
English expatriate footballers
Expatriate soccer players in the United States
English expatriate sportspeople in the United States
Richmond Kickers players
D.C. United non-playing staff
English expatriate football managers
Expatriate soccer managers in the United States
George Washington Colonials men's soccer players